The GIFT University, formerly Gujranwala Institute of Future Technologies, is a private university located in Gujranwala, Punjab, Pakistan. It is only chartered University in region Gujranwala.

History
It was established in 2002 as Gujranwala Institute of Future Technology. The university offers degree programs in various fields such as business administration, accounting and finance, psychology, mass communication, education, computer science, information technology, software engineering, electrical engineering, home economics, textile and fashion design and English language and literature etc.

References

External links
 Official website

Educational institutions established in 2002
Universities and colleges in Gujranwala District
Private universities and colleges in Punjab, Pakistan
2002 establishments in Pakistan
Engineering universities and colleges in Pakistan
Education in Gujranwala